Project: F.E.T.U.S. is an album by rapper One Be Lo that was first released in 2002. Over half the album was recorded before the release of the Binary Star album Masters of the Universe in 2000. The original goal of the album was to press only 1000 copies for fans that wanted to hear anything from One Be Lo that was available but after those copies were sold in less than 2 weeks they decided to press more. The LA Underground picked up the album and re-released it in 2003, releasing it under the name "OneBeLo aka OneManArmy" (originally labeled as just OneBeLo). The whole album was intentionally not mixed or mastered and is basically a compilation of rejected songs for the album L.I.F.E.

The acronym F.E.T.U.S. stands for "For Everyone That UnderStands".

Track listing

2002 albums
One Be Lo albums